Oliver Pocher (born 18 February 1978) is a German comedian, entertainer, television personality and host.

Early life and professional training 
Pocher is the son of Gerhard and Jutta Pocher; he was born and grew up in Hanover, West Germany. His parents are Jehovah's Witnesses and he too was raised as one. In 2007, Pocher stated that, unlike his parents, he had no contact with the organisation anymore as he claimed "not to have agreed with their rules".

Reports that Pocher had attended a Waldorf school were denied by his management.
Pocher successfully completed his training as an insurance broker at "Signal Iduna Bauspar AG".

During the time of his apprenticeship, he had some part-time jobs at various radio stations and as a DJ in clubs and during family celebrations. He also appeared in the comedian group Holla-Bolla and as an entertainer at Birte Karalus, a German chat show. After his apprenticeship, he worked for the Swiss life insurance company "Schweizerische Lebensversicherungs- und Rentenanstalt" (today: SwissLife) and the "HDI Lebensversicherung AG" (HDI life insurance).

Career 

Pocher's first television appearance was on 28 October 1998 at the afternoon chat show of Bärbel Schäfer. Pocher was given five minutes to make the audience laugh.

On 29 September 1999, he presented the show Chart Surfer Trash Top 100, Was geht ab, Planet Viva and finally 2002 his own show Alles Pocher, ... oder was?.

Between January 2003 and 14 April 2006, Pocher presented the show Rent a Pocher on ProSieben.

In 2006, he recorded the single "Schwarz und Weiß", a song dedicated to the 2006 FIFA World Cup. A music video was made featuring Pocher as several pressbox speakers, as well as him performing the song in front of fans dressed in Team Germany attire.

From October 2007 to April 2009, Pocher joined established late-night host Harald Schmidt's show on the Das Erste television channel, with the show being called Schmidt und Pocher.

In 2008, his third single "Bringt ihn heim" ("bring him home") was released. It is a song for the European Football Championship of 2008. The original version is Baschi's number-one hit (Switzerland) "Bring en hei". 

Pocher's contract was not renewed after April 2009, so he was hired by Sat.1 instead to present his own late-night show, Die Oliver Pocher Show. The show's ratings were always below the station's average and even slipping over the course of the run until it was cancelled in March 2011.

Personal life 

From 2010 to 2014, Pocher was married to Alessandra "Sandy" Meyer-Wölden. They share three children.

Pocher dated German tennis player Sabine Lisicki for almost three years. The couple split in 2016.

In 2017, Pocher married his second wife, Amira Aly. Pocher has two more children with his current wife.

Criticism and scandals 
Pocher has been widely criticised for his jokes at the expense of others. After he recommended plastic surgery to a woman of the audience of the Wetten, dass..? ("Wanna Bet..?") episode on 22 January 2005, he was sued for damages of €25,000. Although he apologised to her on the phone and repeated this apology in public during one of his shows, he was not able to solve this conflict out of court. On 11 January, Pocher was sentenced by the district court of Hanover to pay a fine of €6,000. The judge in charge called Pocher's statement ("You look quite old for your age") a "very insulting comment". 

The public insulting continued in January 2008 during the TV show Johannes B. Kerner when Pocher once again made fun of the same woman's appearance and mocked the verdict. As a result, another suit was filed against him. The victim's lawyer explained that the woman was insulted and that the topic is repeatedly brought up by people whom she meets during her work. Pocher did not comment on this. Statements such as those made by Pocher could be legal in the future, as the Council of Europe is advising to decriminalise insults.

Pocher caused a scandal in July 2005 during the ZDF (German broadcasting station) show Gottschalk & Friends when he insulted Mariah Carey and later accidentally spat water onto her. For this action, he was harshly criticised by some newspapers and by the broadcast station in charge. Gottschalk himself kept calm and commented on the incident: "Of course I don't want to have jokes at the expense of others during my show. ... If you invite Pocher to your show, however, you should expect a different atmosphere than with, for example, Alfred Biolek."

When Pocher mocked the personal life of singer Sarah Connor and her reality show, Connor sued Pocher. While the exact outcome of the lawsuit is not known, Pocher did apologise to Connor.

In January 2009, during the TV show Schmidt & Pocher, Pocher spoofed the Hitler assassin Claus Schenk Graf von Stauffenberg, who is portrayed by Tom Cruise in Valkyrie. He had to face negative feedback for this and thereafter the broadcasting commission examined this incident.

In February 2014, at the Vienna Opera Ball, Pocher was interviewed by Mirjam Weichselbraun with Kim Kardashian. He joked that he was only going to dance when "Niggas in Vienna" was played.

Shows

Discography

Albums 
2007: It's My Life – Aus dem Leben eines B-Promis

Singles 
2006: "Schwarz und Weiß"
2007: "Ich kann nix dafür" (with Nena & Stephan Remmler)
2008: "Bringt ihn heim" (68th-best-selling single in Germany of 2008)
2009: "Kennst du die Stars" (Bushido feat. Oliver Pocher)
2010: "Wir gehen nur zurück um Anlauf zu nehm

DVDs 
2005: Best of Pocher: Aufstieg & Fall eines B-Promis (2 DVDs)
2007: It's My Life – Aus dem Leben eines B-Promis (2 DVDs)
2008: Best of Schmidt & Pocher (2 DVDs)
2009: Gefährliches Halbwissen – Die Weltrekord Live-Show (2 DVDs)

Filmography 
 2005: Durch die Nacht mit Moritz Bleibtreu und Oliver Pocher (TV)
 2006: 7 Zwerge – Der Wald ist nicht genug
 2006: Hui Buh – Das Schlossgespenst
 2007: Vollidiot, as Simon Peters
 2009: Alarm für Cobra 11, as Oliver Sturm
 2010: Hanni & Nanni, as Rüdiger Hack
 2012: 
 2015: Bruder vor Luder
 2017: Unter deutschen Betten

Awards

2004 
 Golden Bravo Otto in the category "Comedy"

2005 
 Golden Bravo Otto in the category "Comedy"
 Comet in the category "Beste Live-Comedy"
 Deutscher Comedypreis for "Beste Comedy-Show"
 Jetix Kids Award in the category "Coolster TV-Star"

2006 
 Goldene Schallplatte for over 45.000 sold DVDs
 Golden Bravo Otto in the category "Comedy"
 Radio Regenbogen Comedy Award
 Goldene Schallplatte for more than 220.000 sold CDs of Schwarz und Weiß

2008 
Preis der beleidigten Zuschauer ("award of the offended viewers")

References

External links 

  
 Stephen Colbert on Oliver Pocher (video, 2008)
  Visiting Oliver Pocher's national team

Living people
1978 births
German male comedians
Television people from Lower Saxony
Former Jehovah's Witnesses
Bundesvision Song Contest
Musicians from Hanover
ARD (broadcaster) people
RTL Group people
Sat.1 people
ProSieben people